Bingham is a small lunar impact crater that is located on the far side of the Moon, relative to the Earth. It is named after the American academic, explorer and politician Hiram Bingham III. It lies just to the southeast of the much larger crater Lobachevskiy, and the northwestern part of the rim of Bingham is partly overlaid by ejecta from Lobachevsky. To the northeast of Bingham is the crater Guyot, and about a crater diameter to the south-southeast is Katchalsky. This is a roughly circular crater formation with a slight outward bulge along the southeastern side.

Satellite craters

By convention these features are identified on lunar maps by placing the letter on the side of the crater midpoint that is closest to Bingham.

In popular culture
Bingham, along with another crater, Viviani, was referenced in the Midsomer Murders season 14 episode 'Dark Secrets'.

References

External links

Bingham at The Moon Wiki

Impact craters on the Moon